The Herne Tavern is a pub at 2 Forest Hill Rd, Honor Oak, London SE22 0RR.

It is on the Campaign for Real Ale's National Inventory of Historic Pub Interiors.

It was built in the mid-19th century, but the interior was remodelled in the interwar period and has remained largely unaltered since.

References

Pubs in the London Borough of Southwark
National Inventory Pubs
Honor Oak